Operation Balsam was a British naval operation in World War II, from 10–20 June 1945, under the command of Commodore Geoffrey Oliver. The third in a string of similar missions, the objectives were the naval bombardment and aerial strikes on Japanese airfields in Sumatra, Japanese vessels in the Strait of Malacca, and aerial reconnaissance.

Operational detail
Naval forces involved sailed from Trincomalee on 14 June 1945. The carriers transported  Grumman F6F Hellcats of 804 Squadron and 808 Squadron, and Supermarine Seafires of 809 Squadron.

Flights were restricted to photo-reconnaissance over southern Malaya for the first few days of the active operation, on 18 and 19 June.  One account describes how the fighter pilots "were growing restless on a diet of undiluted CAPS, but Commodore Oliver reassured them they would have an opportunity to 'leave their cards'". On 20 June, the fighters engaged in their first offensive sorties against the airfields at Lhokseumawe, Medan and Binjai. The results were reported as follows:

References

Operation balsam - Codenames : Operation of WW2

World War II operations and battles of the Southeast Asia Theatre
Naval aviation operations and battles
World War II aerial operations and battles of the Pacific theatre
Aerial operations and battles of World War II involving the United Kingdom
Naval battles and operations of World War II involving the United Kingdom